The Founders Memorial, also known as Founding of Boston, is a 1930 sculpture by John Francis Paramino in Boston Common, in Boston, Massachusetts.

Description
The memorial features a bronze relief set in granite. The relief is approximately 5.5 ft. tall and 11 ft. wide. It depicts William Blaxton (left) greeting John Winthrop (right) and others, including Ann Pollard, two Native Americans, and an allegorical female representing Boston. The slate and cast iron base measures approximately 15x 45 x 20 ft.

History
The memorial was commissioned by the city to commemorate Boston's 300th anniversary. It was installed in 1930 and dedicated on September 17 of that year. The work was surveyed by the Smithsonian Institution's "Save Outdoor Sculpture!" program in 1993.

References

External links

 

1930 establishments in Massachusetts
1930 sculptures
Allegorical sculptures in the United States
Boston Common
Bronze sculptures in Massachusetts
Granite sculptures in Massachusetts
Monuments and memorials in Boston
Outdoor sculptures in Boston
Sculptures of men in Massachusetts
Sculptures of Native Americans
Sculptures of women in Massachusetts